The 17th Emmy Awards, later known as the 17th Primetime Emmy Awards, were handed out on September 12, 1965.  The ceremony was hosted by Sammy Davis, Jr. and Danny Thomas.  Winners are listed in bold and series' networks are in parentheses.

The structure of the ceremony was a complete departure from previous years. Categories were streamlined so that there were only four major categories (the previous year had 20 major categories). As a result of this, only five shows won an award. NBC's Hallmark Hall of Fame was the top show of the night, winning three major awards. The new format would be scrapped for the traditional one the following year. The traditional format would be used for all future Primetime Emmy Awards ceremonies.

Winners and nominees
Winners are listed first, highlighted in boldface, and indicated with a double dagger (‡).

Programs

Acting

Directing

Writing

Most major nominations
By network 
 NBC – 21
 CBS – 14
 ABC – 2

 By program
 Hallmark Hall of Fame (NBC) – 6
 The Defenders (CBS) / The Dick Van Dyke Show (CBS) / My Name is Barbra (CBS) – 3

Most major awards
By network 
 CBS – 8
 NBC – 3

 By program
 Hallmark Hall of Fame (NBC) – 3
 The Defenders (CBS) / The Dick Van Dyke Show (CBS) / My Name is Barbra (CBS) / Young People's Concerts (CBS) – 2

Notes

References

External links
 Emmys.com list of 1965 Nominees & Winners
 

017
Primetime Emmy Awards
Primetime Emmy Awards
Primetime Emmy
Primetime Emmy Awards